Anthony Charles Hockley Smith (born Anthony Charles Smith, 31 October 1935) is a British novelist and playwright from Kew.

Early life and career 
Smith was educated at Hampton Grammar School and Corpus Christi College, Cambridge, where he read Modern Languages. On starting his writing career, to distinguish himself from other writers of the same name he added the initial "H", representing his grandmother's maiden name, Hockley.

Since 1960 his home has been in Bristol. From 1965 to 1969 he was Senior Research Associate at Richard Hoggart's Centre for Contemporary Cultural Studies at Birmingham University, and he has held visiting posts at the Universities of Bristol, Bournemouth, and Texas (Austin). From 1964 to 1973 he did literary work for the Royal Shakespeare Company, and later some for the National Theatre.

In 1971, Peter Brook invited him to Iran for three months to write a book about the Orghast project that Brook and Ted Hughes were undertaking. He was a director of the Cheltenham Literature Festival in 1978, 1979, and 1999. He has two daughters, Imogen and Sophie, and a son, Oliver Smith.

Bibliography

Novels
The Crowd (1965) ASIN: B0006BWG2S
Zero Summer (1971) 
Treatment (1976) 
Sebastian the Navigator (1985) 
The Dangerous Memoir of Citizen Sade (2000)

Thrillers
The Jericho Gun (1977) 
Extra Cover (1981)

Novelizations
Edward and Mrs. Simpson (British TV series) (1978) 
The Dark Crystal (movie) (1982) 
Wagner (movie) (in German and Italian, 1983) . English-language edition (2012) .
Lady Jane (movie) (1985) 
Labyrinth (movie) (1986)

Non-fiction
Orghast at Persepolis: An account of the experiment in theatre directed by Peter Brook and written by Ted Hughes (1972)  and (1973) 
Paper voices: The popular press and social change, 1935–1965 (with Elizabeth Immirzi and Trevor Blackwell) (1975) 
Dickens of London (biography, ghosted for Wolf Mankowitz) (1976) 
Poems, selected with a foreword by Tom Stoppard (2009) 
WordSmith, a memoir (2012) 

Stories and poems for BBC radio, Transatlantic Review, The Listener, etc.

Selected plays
Albert's Bridge Extended (co-written with Tom Stoppard), Edinburgh Festival (1978)
Master of Letters, The Playwrights Company at the New Vic, Bristol (1979)
God's Wonderful Railway, Bristol Old Vic (1985)
Pericles (reconstruction of Shakespeare's), Theater Emory, Atlanta (1987); Show of Strength Theatre Company, Bristol (1990)
Up The Feeder, Down The Mouth, Bristol Old Vic (1997, 2001). Text published 2001 ; illustrated edition, 2012, 
Albert’s Bridge – the Musical (composer David Lyon), Shaftesbury Community Theatre (1999)
The Redcliffe Hermit, Head Heart + 2 Fingers, Bristol (2005). Text published 2005, 
Doctor Love (Molière-based musical, composer David Lyon, Tobacco Factory, Bristol (2008)
Walking The Chains, The Passenger Shed, Bristol (2015)

TV and cinema
With wife, subject of John Boorman's 6-part BBC docudrama The Newcomers (1964). Wrote and presented about 200 arts programmes and documentaries for HTV and BBC. Six plays televised. Three screenplays.

Editing and journalism
At Cambridge, edited the literary magazine delta and was Arts Editor of Varsity, the student newspaper. Co-editor of Universities' Poetry (anthologies). With Tom Stoppard edited an Arts Page in the Western Daily Press in 1960–1963. Has also reported cricket for The Times, reviewed theatre for The Guardian, and wrote features for The Observer, Sunday Times, Telegraph Magazine, New Society, The Listener, London Magazine, etc.
Contributed essay "The Art of Friendship" to Derek Balmer: A Singular Vision (Sansom & Co, 2012).

References

External links

A. C. H. Smith Papers at the Harry Ransom Center

1935 births
Living people
20th-century British novelists
21st-century British novelists
Alumni of Corpus Christi College, Cambridge
British dramatists and playwrights
Writers from Bristol
British male novelists
British male dramatists and playwrights
20th-century British male writers
21st-century British male writers